Trophon celebensis is a species of sea snail, a marine gastropod mollusk, in the family Muricidae, the murex snails or rock snails. Trophon celebensis reproduce through sexual reproduction, unlike some other snails which do so through asexual reproduction.

Distribution
Can be found off of the Indonesian island of Sulawesi.

References

celebensis
Gastropods described in 1913